Psalm 34 is the 34th psalm of the Book of Psalms, beginning in English in the King James Version: "I will bless the LORD at all times: his praise shall continually be in my mouth." The Book of Psalms is part of the third section of the Hebrew Bible, and a book of the Christian Old Testament. 
In the slightly different numbering system used in the Greek Septuagint and Latin Vulgate translations of the Bible, this psalm is Psalm 33. In Latin, it is known as "Benedicam Dominum in omni tempore". 

Psalm 34 is attributed to David. The Psalm's subtitle, A Psalm of David when he pretended madness before Abimelech, who drove him away, and he departed, derives from when David was living with the Philistines, but the account of this event in 1 Samuel 21 refers to the king as Achish, not Abimelech. However, this seeming contradiction is easily explainable when you understand that Abimelech would have been his title and Achish, his actual name. The psalm is an acrostic poem in the Hebrew Alphabet, one of a series of songs of thanksgiving. It is the first Psalm which describes angels as guardians of the righteous.

The psalm forms a regular part of Jewish, Catholic, Lutheran, Anglican and other Protestant liturgies. It has inspired hymns based on it, and has been set to music.

Text

Hebrew Bible version 
Following is the Hebrew text of Psalm 34:

King James Version 
 I will bless the LORD at all times: his praise shall continually be in my mouth.
 My soul shall make her boast in the LORD: the humble shall hear thereof, and be glad.
 O magnify the LORD with me, and let us exalt his name together.
 I sought the LORD, and he heard me, and delivered me from all my fears.
 They looked unto him, and were lightened: and their faces were not ashamed.
 This poor man cried, and the LORD heard him, and saved him out of all his troubles.
The angel of the LORD encampeth round about them that fear him, and delivereth them.
 O taste and see that the LORD is good: blessed is the man that trusteth in him.
 O fear the LORD, ye his saints: for there is no want to them that fear him.
 The young lions do lack, and suffer hunger: but they that seek the LORD shall not want any good thing.
 Come, ye children, hearken unto me: I will teach you the fear of the LORD.
 What man is he that desireth life, and loveth many days, that he may see good?
 Keep thy tongue from evil, and thy lips from speaking guile.
 Depart from evil, and do good; seek peace, and pursue it.
 The eyes of the LORD are upon the righteous, and his ears are open unto their cry.
 The face of the LORD is against them that do evil, to cut off the remembrance of them from the earth.
 The righteous cry, and the LORD heareth, and delivereth them out of all their troubles.
 The LORD is nigh unto them that are of a broken heart; and saveth such as be of a contrite spirit.
 Many are the afflictions of the righteous: but the LORD delivereth him out of them all.
 He keepeth all his bones: not one of them is broken.
 Evil shall slay the wicked: and they that hate the righteous shall be desolate.
 The LORD redeemeth the soul of his servants: and none of them that trust in him shall be desolate.

Structure
The psalm could be structured in the following manner:
 Vers 2-4: Hymn introduction
 Vers 5: Basic praising, preaching the fate of the Psalmist
 Vers 6-11: teaching, which is evident from his fate
 Vers 12-22: didactic poem 1
 Vers 13-15: Question - answer:  
 Vers 16-22: Collection of wise sayings.

It is an acrostic poem in the Hebrew Alphabet, with each letter of the Hebrew alphabet beginning a verse in sequential order; the lone exception is waw ( ו ), which begins the second clause of verse six. Verse 22, the concluding statement, begins with pe, outside the acrostic scheme. The Old Testament scholar Hermann Gunkel felt that the acrostic nature of the Psalm made any historical, or theological analysis impossible. This psalm is an acrostic of confidence, as is Psalm 25, with which it has many similarities.

Verse 11
Come, you children, listen to me;I will teach you the fear of the Lord.The psalmist is now "teacher"; "children" is the customary term for students in wisdom literature.

Uses
Judaism

 Psalm 34 is recited in its entirety during Pesukei Dezimra on Shabbat, Yom Tov, and - in many communities - on Hoshana Rabbah.
Verse 4 is recited when the Torah scroll is taken out of the ark.
 Verses 10-11 are recited by Ashkenazim as part of the final paragraph of Birkat Hamazon.
 Verses 14-15 form the basis for part of the closing paragraph of the Amidah.

New Testament
Some verses of Psalm 34 are referenced in the New Testament:
 Verse 8 is quoted by St. Peter in 1 Peter . 
 Verses 12-16 are cited in 1 Peter . 
 Verse 18 is paraphrased in Matthew 5:3.
 Verse 20 is alluded to in John .

Catholicism
According to the Rule of St. Benedict around 530, this psalm was traditionally sung at the office of Matins on Mondays in monasteries.Mont des Cats Abbey, La distribution des Psaumes dans la Règle de Saint Benoît, accessed 29 October 2021

Currently, in the Liturgy of the Hours, Psalm 34 is recited on Saturdays in the first and third weeks of the four weekly cycle of readings and for the holy celebrations. It is often used as a responsorial psalm.

Book of Common Prayer
In the Church of England's Book of Common Prayer, this psalm is appointed to be read on the evening of the sixth day of the month.

Musical settings
Heinrich Schütz composed a choral setting on a German metred paraphrase of Psalm 34, "Ich will bei meinem Leben rühmen den Herren mein", as part of the Becker Psalter.

Several musical settings focus on the verse 8, "Taste and see", which is suitable as music for the Eucharist. Vaughan Williams set it, titled "O taste and see", for soprano and mixed choir with organ introduction, for the Coronation of Elizabeth II in Westminster Abbey on 2 June 1953. It was included as No. 3 of the 2015 album Psalms II by Shane & Shane, and as No. of the 2017 album Fractures'' by Sons of Korah.

References

External links 

 
 
 Psalms Chapter 39 text in Hebrew and English, mechon-mamre.org
 Psalm 34 – Praise from the Cave text and detailed commentary, enduringword.com
 Of David, when he feigned madness before Abimelech, who drove him out and he went away. / I will bless the LORD at all times; / his praise shall be always in my mouth text and footnotes, usccb.org United States Conference of Catholic Bishops
 Psalm 34:1 introduction and text, biblestudytools.com
 Psalm 34 / Refrain: O taste and see that the Lord is gracious. Church of England
 Psalm 34 at biblegateway.com
 Hymns for Psalm 34 hymnary.org
 Recording of a slow tune to verses 12-14.

034
Shacharit for Shabbat and Yom Tov
Works attributed to David